Filippo De Nobili (Catanzaro, 23 September 1875 – Catanzaro, 7 February 1962) was an Italian writer, poet, historian and politician anti-fascist and anti-monarchist.

Biography 
Member of the De Nobili family of Catanzaro, he was the eldest son of Carlo De Nobili (1845–1908), baron of Magliacane, and of Concetta Pugliese. Filippo De Nobili was thus also the great-grandson of the baron Carlo De Nobili (1777–1831), first mayor of Catanzaro, knight of Malta and well-known economist.

Filippo De Nobili studied law at the Sapienza University of Rome, where he met and became the disciple of the Marxist philosopher Antonio Labriola. De Nobili quickly became one of three main leaders of the student movement in Rome, known as the goliardia romana, and also founded a movement supporting the abolition of monarchy and inspired by the thoughts of Jesus Christ. However, in July 1896, he was expelled from the university for leading a student's agitation, following the replacement of the Minister of Education Guido Baccelli, a left-wing politician, by Emanuele Gianturco, a moderate catholic. The Marxist philosopher Antonio Labriola tried to protect the students but a final verdict confirmed the expulsion of the three leaders, with the prohibition of attending any Italian university for two years.

Two years later, in 1898, Filippo De Nobili was allowed to continue his studies in law at the University of Messina, in Sicily. There he became a close friend of the decadent poet Giovanni Pascoli, before graduating and becoming a lawyer in Catanzaro.

From 1908 to 1958, succeeding his father, he directed the Library Onestà e Lavoro of Catanzaro, a public library founded in 1889 and today called Municipal Library «Filippo De Nobili». In 1910, the Library Onestà e Lavoro also merged with the Popular Library of Catanzaro. De Nobili joined the Associazione Italiana Biblioteche since its foundation in 1930, and was one of the inspectors of the public libraries of the region.

Filippo De Nobili was also a journalist, being the director of the newspaper U Spatrunatu and also the co-founder of the socialist journal Battaglia. He wrote articles and satirical pieces in various other political newspapers and magazines, sometimes with the pen name of Fideno. Finally, De Nobili was also an expert of Calabrian linguistic and etymology, helping the German linguist Gerhard Rohlfs to realize one of the first bilingual dictionaries Calabrian-Italian.

In August 1942, Filippo De Nobili and Francesco Maruca clandestinely founded the Communist Federation of the Province of Catanzaro. Years later, the writer Corrado Alvaro wrote a poem titled Il topo e il falegname (The Mouse and the Carpenter) about the relationship between De Nobili and Maruca.

He knew Corrado Alvaro there, when Alvaro was a high school student in Catanzaro. 
He was famous for his  refusal to honor one of the Crown of Italy, in 1934, when he replied: "I should be grateful if, in exchange for the honor, I never want and do not want to, she wants to make a reasonable allowance to my Library ". He laughed over publicly Benito Mussolini when he was in Catanzaro, mimicking the attitude that the Duce had when he was at the window of Piazza Venezia. Filippo De Nobili lived in the Palazzo De Nobili of Magliacane in Catanzaro.

Known for his opposition to the monarchy and after to fascism, Filippo De Nobili was successively socialist, communist and anarchist at the end of his life. Disciple of the Marxist philosopher Antonio Labriola, he was also a close friend of the socialist Mario Casalinuovo, Minister of Transports, and of the communist statesman Fausto Gullo, Minister of Agriculture and after of Justice. His thoughts and his political commitment influenced a whole generation of writers, politicians, and historians in Southern Italy.

References

Further reading 
 Augusto Placanica, Civiltà di Calabria: studi in memoria di Filippo De Nobili
 Guerriera Guerrieri, Un bibliotecario rimpianto (Don Pippo De Nobili)
 Giuseppe Isnardi, Filippo De Nobili (In memoriam)
 Nicola Siciliani de Cumis, Per i cento anni della Biblioteca comunale « Filippo De Nobili » di Catanzaro (1889–1989)

1875 births
1962 deaths